Jelly donut may refer to:

Jelly doughnut, a doughnut with jam filling
Jelly Donut (1979), a woodturned artwork by Merryll Saylan